The 2018–19 Pyramids season was the 10th season in the football club's history and 2nd consecutive and 3rd overall season in the top flight of Egyptian football, the Egyptian Premier League, having been promoted from the Egyptian Second Division in 2017. It was also the 1st season for the club under their new name, after being sold to new owners and renamed from Al Assiouty Sport to Pyramids Football Club. In addition to the domestic league, Pyramids also participated in this season's editions of the domestic cup, the Egypt Cup. The season covered a period from 1 July 2018 to 30 June 2019; however Pyramids played their last match of the season in September 2019.

Kit information
Supplier: Kappa
Sponsors: Saudia, Swyp

Players

Current squad

Out on loan

Transfers

Transfers in

Loans in

Transfers out

Loans out

Friendly matches

Competitions

Overview

Egyptian Premier League

League table

Results summary

Results by round

Matches

Egypt Cup

Pyramids entered the competition from the round of 32 and were given a home tie against Tanta. Starting from the round of 16, all matches were played on stadiums selected by the Egyptian Football Association.

Statistics

Appearances and goals

! colspan="19" style="background:#DCDCDC; text-align:center" | Players joined during the 2019 summer transfer window
|-

! colspan="11" style="background:#DCDCDC; text-align:center" | Players transferred out during the season
|-

|}

Goalscorers

Clean sheets

References

Notes

Pyramids